Nils Otto Hesselberg (1844-1929) was a Norwegian politician for the Liberal Party. He was Chief of Kristiania Police department (1883-1906), secretary to Norway's Council of State (1906-1920), and was appointed state secretary in the first government of Prime Minister Gunnar Knudsen (1908-1910).

References

1844 births
1929 deaths
Government ministers of Norway
Politicians from Tønsberg